was a town located in Miyaki District, Saga Prefecture, Japan. The status of this municipality was changed from a village to a town on May 1, 1962.

As of 2003, the town had an estimated population of 7,361 and a density of 449.66 persons per km2. Its total area was 16.37 km2.

On March 1, 2005, Mine, along with the towns of Kitashigeyasu and Nakabaru (all from Miyaki District), was merged to create the town of Miyaki.

Mine's amenities include a sports center, junior high school, and two convenience stores. There is also a small library located somewhat towards the north. Mine has a small temple to a Buddha that is apparently able to cure warts. Mine is technically in the prefecture of Saga, but the city of Kurume in Fukuoka prefecture is closer than the city of Saga and is used by far more people. The city is just across the river called Mamebashi.

History 
In June 2007 there was an industrial accident which resulted in a toxic cloud of hydrofluoric acid killing 129 and wounding 1267 others. The city is currently in discussions concerning a memorial.

References 

Dissolved municipalities of Saga Prefecture